Ilene Susan Graff (born February 28, 1949) is an American actress and singer.

Life and career
The Queens, New York native began her professional career as a teenager when she performed as a background singer and commercial actress while attending Martin Van Buren High School in Queens Village. She graduated from Ithaca College in 1970.

Graff's Broadway credits include Promises, Promises, Grease, and I Love My Wife. Her television work includes Barnaby Jones, Laverne & Shirley, Mork & Mindy, Three's Company, Lewis & Clark, and St. Elsewhere. From 1985 until 1990, she played what is possibly her best known role, Marsha Cameron Owens, the wife of Bob Uecker's character, George, in the sitcom Mr. Belvedere.

In addition to her roles on television, Graff also appeared in the motion picture Ladybugs playing the girlfriend of Rodney Dangerfield and mother of Jonathan Brandis. Her recent screen credits include films The Things We Carry, Ma-i pa-deo, and Loving Annabelle.

Personal life

Graff is the daughter of Jerry Graff, a member of the musical group The Pied Pipers. While performing in Grease she met and married composer Ben Lanzarone, and they have one daughter, Nikka, born 1983. Graff is the older sister of Tony Award-nominated actor, film producer, writer, film director and former Short Circus member Todd Graff and cousin of Tony winner Randy Graff. She serves as the spokesman for the AMC Cancer Research Center.

Select filmography
 Hart of Dixie .... Ellen Aim (6 episodes, 2011-2015)
 The Things We Carry (2009) .... Ellen Aim
 My Father (2007) .... Nancy Parker ... aka Ellen Aim (South Korea: DVD title)
 Loving Annabelle (2006) .... Mother Immaculata
 Living with Fran  .... Jessica (1 episode, 2006)
 Haunted .... Emily Eastway (1 episode, 2002)
 South Pacific (2001) (TV) .... Singing Ngana ... aka Rodgers & Hammerstein's South Pacific (USA: complete title)
 Touched by an Angel .... Gloria Brewer (1 episode, 1997)
 Abandoned and Deceived (1995) (TV)
 Sisters.... Cynthia (1 episode, 1994)
 Ladybugs (1992) .... Bess
 Walter & Emily .... Dr. Barbara Morris (1 episode, 1992)
 Opposites Attract (1990) (TV) .... Frannie
 Mr. Belvedere .... Marsha Cameron Owens (117 episodes, 1985–1990)
 Jury Duty: The Comedy (1990; TV) .... Marilyn Worth ... aka The Great American Sex Scandal
 New Love, American Style (1 episode, 1986) .... Love at First Sight/Love and the Judge (1986; TV)
 St. Elsewhere .... Heidi Brechman (1 episode, 1985)
 Earthlings (1984) (TV) .... Jane Lassiter
 The Paper Chase.... Carolyn (1 episode, 1983)
 Three's Company .... Daphne Smith (1 episode, 1983)
 Charley's Aunt (1983; TV) .... Kitty Verdun
 Remington Steele.... Ivy Shapiro (1 episode, 1982)
 Madame's Place.... Gloria Beecham Meade (1 episode, 1982)
 Mork & Mindy .... Tracy /Receptionist ... (4 episodes, 1981-1982)
 Lewis & Clark .... Alicia Lewis (3 episodes, 1981)
 Laverne & Shirley .... Monique Dobson (1 episode, 1980)
 Beulah Land (1980; TV mini-series) .... Annabel Davis
 Angie.... Debbie (1 episode, 1980)
 Supertrain .... Penny Whitaker (3 episodes, 1979)
 Barnaby Jones .... Stephanie Capello (2 episodes, 1979)

References

External links
 Official website
 
 

1949 births
Living people
Actresses from New York City
American film actresses
American musical theatre actresses
American stage actresses
American television actresses
Ithaca College alumni
Martin Van Buren High School alumni
People from Queens, New York
Singers from New York City
20th-century American actresses
21st-century American actresses